Giovani Henrique Amorim da Silva (born 1 January 2004), simply known as Giovani, is a Brazilian professional footballer who plays as a forward for Palmeiras.

Club career
Born in Itaquaquecetuba, São Paulo, Giovani joined Palmeiras' youth setup in 2014, aged ten. In September 2020, aged just 16, he was included in the main squad's 50-men list for the 2020 Copa Libertadores.

Giovani made his first team debut on 3 March 2021, coming on as a late substitute for Gustavo Scarpa in a 2–2 Campeonato Paulista away draw against Corinthians. On 1 June, he renewed his contract until 2024.

Giovani made his Série A debut on 30 November 2021, starting and scoring his team's second in a 3–1 away win over Cuiabá.

Career statistics

Honours
Palmeiras
Copa Libertadores: 2021
Copa São Paulo de Futebol Júnior: 2022
Recopa Sudamericana: 2022
Campeonato Paulista: 2022
Campeonato Brasileiro: 2022
Supercopa do Brasil: 2022

References

External links
Palmeiras profile 

2004 births
Living people
Footballers from São Paulo (state)
Brazilian footballers
Association football forwards
Campeonato Brasileiro Série A players
Sociedade Esportiva Palmeiras players